The 1950 Soviet football championship Class B was the 10th season of the Soviet football championship second tier and inaugural season of the Class B (predecessor of Soviet First League). In 1950 the Soviet football championship rebranded its both tiers from groups First (Pervaya Gruppa) and Second (Vtoraya Gruppa) to Classes A and B. 

FC VMS Moscow won the championship.

Organization
The league was reduced from a multi-group tournament to single group to which were grandfathered seven teams from last season "Central Zone" and one team from every other zones, also two more teams were promoted. Many teams from last season were forced into relegation to their respective republican competitions.

Promoted teams
 Lokomotiv Petrozavodsk (debut, runner-up of the Karelo-Finnish Championship)
 Bolshevik Stalinabad (debut, newly established team from the Tajik Soviet Socialist Republic)
 Bolshevik were promoted ahead of the republican champions Dynamo Stalinabad

Relegated teams
No teams were relegated from the 1949 Soviet Pervaya Gruppa (top tier)

Final standings

Relegation play-off

Ukrainian SSR
To the play-off qualified the champion of the 1950 Football Championship of the Ukrainian SSR and the worst Ukrainian team of masters of the 1950 Soviet Class B.

|}

Russian SFSR
Worst team of the Russian SFSR qualified for relegation playoff. Both matches were taken place in Makhachkala. The city of Kalinin were champions of the 1950 Football Championship of the Russian SFSR.

|}

For 1950 MVO Moscow was stationed in city of Kalinin.

Turkmen SSR

|}

Karelo-Finnish SSR

|}

Lithuanian SSR

|}

Belarusian SSR

|}

|}

Kazakh SSR

|}

Moldavian SSR

|}

Uzbek SSR

|}

Estonian SSR

|}

Tajik SSR

|}

Kyrgyz SSR

|}

Number of teams by republics

See also
 1950 Soviet Class A
 1950 Soviet Cup

References

 1950 at rsssf.com
 1950 Ukrainian championship at "Luhansk Our Football" (in Russian)

1950
2
Soviet
Soviet